is a Japanese romantic comedy manga series written and illustrated by Kaneyoshi Izumi. It was serialized in  Shogakukan's Betsucomi magazine from October 2002 to May 2006 and later collected into nine bound volumes under the Flower Comics imprint.

In 2006, Sonnan ja nē yo won the 51st Shogakukan Manga Award in the shōjo category.

Publication
Sonnan ja nē yo was serialized in Shogakukan's Betsucomi magazine from the November 2002 issue (released in October) to the June 2006 issue (released in May). Shogakukan collected the individual chapters into nine bound volumes under the Flower Comics imprint. The first volume was released on March 26, 2003, and the last volume was released on June 26, 2006.

List of volumes

Reception
Sonnan ja nē yo won the 51st Shogakukan Manga Award in the shōjo manga category in 2006. The manga reached a circulation of 1,200,000 copies with six volumes in May of that year.

References

External links
 
  

2002 manga
Romantic comedy anime and manga
Shogakukan manga
Shōjo manga
Winners of the Shogakukan Manga Award for shōjo manga